Tassy Johnson (22 September 1916 – 24 April 1981) was an Australian cyclist. He competed in the individual road race and the time trial events at the 1936 Summer Olympics and won a silver medal in the Time Trial at the 1938 British Empire Games in Sydney.

Following his retirement from cycling,  Johnson refereed 27 of the 29 Sun cycling tours of Victoria, Australian championships and the Bendigo Madison.

Johnson died of a heart attack aged 65 in Melbourne on 24 April 1981.

References

External links
 

1916 births
1981 deaths
Australian male cyclists
Olympic cyclists of Australia
Cyclists at the 1936 Summer Olympics
Place of birth missing
Commonwealth Games medallists in cycling
Commonwealth Games silver medallists for Australia
Cyclists at the 1938 British Empire Games
20th-century Australian people
People from Essendon, Victoria
Cyclists from Melbourne
Australian referees and umpires
Medallists at the 1938 British Empire Games